, also romanized in Japan as Evangelion: Death and Evangelion: Rebirth, is a 1997 Japanese animated science fiction psychological drama film. It is the first installment of the Neon Genesis Evangelion feature film project and consists of two parts. The project, whose overarching title translates literally to New Century Gospel: The Movie, was released in response to the success of the TV series and a strong demand by fans for an alternate ending. Its components have since been re-edited and re-released several times.

Plot

Evangelion:Death 

The first section, Evangelion:Death, is a 're-cap' editing together scenes from the first 24 episodes of Neon Genesis Evangelion in the form of a clip show, along with additional animation created after the show's original broadcast. This includes scenes from the original show re-drawn shot-for-shot, entirely new shots augmenting existing sequences, and linking segments based around the premise of the four main characters playing Pachelbel's Canon as a string quartet. Some of the additional shots and re-drawn animation would later be re-edited into the extended, 'Home Video Versions' of episodes 21-24 included on the Japanese VHS/Laserdisc and American and European Platinum Collection releases of the TV series, commonly known in the west as the "Director's Cut" versions though there is no clear substantiation of director Hideaki Anno's role in these. Death ends with credits accompanied by a double string quartet arrangement of Pachelbel's Canon.

Evangelion:Death(True) screened on the Japanese satellite TV channel WOWOW; this second cut of Evangelion:Death was re-edited by Masayuki, who held multiple creative roles throughout the franchise's production, removing some of the extra footage new to the feature. This was released on home video for the first time as part of the Archives of Evangelion DVD box set on August 26, 2015.

Evangelion:Rebirth 

The second section, Evangelion: Rebirth, consists of approximately 24 minutes of entirely new animation that would eventually form the first third of the alternate ending film The End of Evangelion, released four months later as the second stage in the Neon Genesis Evangelion: Death & Rebirth project. Serving as a preview while End was still in production, Rebirth only covers the initial preparations of the Human Instrumentality Project and the invasion of the Geofront by the JSSDF, ending with the arrival of the Mass Production Evas. Because of its unfinished state, there are differences between Rebirth and the portion of the finished The End of Evangelion it covers. These differences include editing, shots that were later re-drawn entirely, and soundtrack cues that were replaced or further edited. The section ends with credits accompanied by the song Tamashii No Refrain by Yoko Takahashi.

Cast

Production and release 
Death and Rebirth were co-produced by Kadokawa Shoten, Gainax, TV Tokyo, Sega, and Toei Company.

The film opened in second place at the Japanese box office, just behind the opening of 101 Dalmatians.

On July 30, 2002, Manga Entertainment released Death and Rebirth on VHS and DVD in both dub and sub under the title Neon Genesis Evangelion: Death & Rebirth.

On July 26, 2005, Manga Entertainment released Death & Rebirth and The End of Evangelion together in the United States as a two-disc set.

The English production made similar creative changes in the dubbing of the film as had been made to The End of Evangelion. One notable change was the alteration of the sound effect between the scene featuring Kaji to one of Shinji informing Asuka of his death. According to the DVD commentary, English ADR director Amanda Winn-Lee, also the voice of Rei in the dub, felt the sound was not a proper "gunshot" and replaced it with a more overt effect. However, the Japanese screenplay mentions that the sound effect is not a gunshot at all, but rather the sound of a slap (the following scene implies Asuka has slapped Shinji's face).

Revival of Evangelion 
The final stage of the New Century Gospel: The Movie project, a theatrical revival with the romanized title Revival of Evangelion was released on March 8, 1998, consisting of Death (True)² (a third, further edit of Death(True), with a few removed shots crucial to the plot edited back in) followed by a four-minute intermission and then the finished The End of Evangelion. In 2015, Revival was released on the Japanese Renewal of Evangelion Blu-ray box set along with End and the original theatrical cuts of Death and Rebirth. Death (True)² is also the version most widely released in the West, having been opted by Netflix and GKIDS for its distribution service and Blu-ray box set respectively. Death (True)² and End are separated in these Western releases, removing the intermission, but some campaigns have nevertheless collated the two under the banner Neon Genesis Evangelion: The Feature Film.

Reception 
Chris Beveridge from Mania gave it an overall "A−" score. Robert Nelson of T.H.E.M. Anime Reviews gave it a 3 out of 5. Japan Cinema gave the film a C+. Adam Arnold from Animefringe gave the film an overall score of 72%.

See also 

 The End of Evangelion

References

External links 
 
 
 
 Anime Jump! review

1997 anime films
Anime films composed by Shirō Sagisu
Films directed by Hideaki Anno
Films directed by Kazuya Tsurumaki
Films with screenplays by Hideaki Anno
Films edited from television programs
Films set in the 2010s
Japanese science fiction action films
Manga Entertainment
Mecha anime and manga
Death and Rebirth
Production I.G
1997 science fiction films
1997 films
1990s psychological drama films
1997 drama films
1997 action films